Alexander Barta (born February 2, 1983) is  German professional ice hockey centre currently playing for Düsseldorfer EG of the Deutsche Eishockey Liga (DEL). He has previously captained the Hamburg Freezers of the Deutsche Eishockey Liga.

Playing career
Between 2001 and 2005 he played four seasons with Eisbären Berlin in the Deutsche Eishockey Liga (DEL). He joined fellow DEL team Hamburg Freezers in 2005 and played six seasons with the club. Barta was selected to the DEL All-Star game in 2005, 2006, and 2007.

Barta was selected to play for the German national team for the 2010 Winter Olympics. He previously represented Germany at the 2003 World Junior Ice Hockey Championships, the 2005, 2006, 2007, 2009, 2010 and 2011 Ice Hockey World Championships, and the 2006 Winter Olympics.

Barta signed a one-year contract with Malmö Redhawks of the HockeyAllsvenskan on June 17, 2011.

Following a second Swedish season in 2012-13 with Rögle BK in the Elitserien, Barta returned to his native Germany, signing a two-year contract with EHC München of the DEL on May 6, 2013.

At the completion of his contract in Munich, Barta joined his older brother, Björn, in signing a one-year deal with ERC Ingolstadt on May 6, 2015. Following the 2015-16 season, he opted to put pen to paper on a three-year deal with fellow DEL side Düsseldorfer EG.

Career statistics

Regular season and playoffs

International

References

External links
 

1983 births
Düsseldorfer EG players
Eisbären Berlin players
German ice hockey centres
Hamburg Freezers players
Ice hockey people from Berlin
Ice hockey players at the 2006 Winter Olympics
ERC Ingolstadt players
Living people
Malmö Redhawks players
EHC München players
Olympic ice hockey players of Germany
Rögle BK players
Rote Teufel Bad Nauheim players